The International School of Choueifat – Lebanon is the mother school of the SABIS group of schools. It was established in the village of Choueifat, Lebanon in 1886 by Tanios Saad and Louisa Procter, an Irish woman who was teaching in the area. It was originally for girls only. In the 1890s Tanios Saad visited England to examine the British educational system. He led the school until his death in 1953.

The school was expanded and renovated under Charles Saad, who replaced Tanios. It opened its first overseas branch in Sharjah, UAE in 1975. In 1983 the school had to relocate due to the Lebanese Civil War (but resumed its original location in 1991). Schools were opened in the UK in 1983 and the US in 1985.

See also 

 International School of Choueifat
 Education in the Ottoman Empire

External links 
 http://www.isc-lebanon.com/

Educational institutions established in 1886
Schools in Lebanon
International schools in Lebanon
1886 establishments in the Ottoman Empire